

M-11 
Originally known as the Human Robot, the character was given the name "M-11" in the 2006 to 2007 Agents of Atlas miniseries as an allusion to its first appearance in Menace #11 from Marvel Comics' 1950s predecessor, Atlas Comics. In an alternate reality from mainstream Earth, a scientist's newly created robot is programmed by the scientist's greedy business manager to murder the scientist. The incomplete robot, however, continues through with his directive to "kill the man in the room", and kills the business manager when the man enters. The robot then leaves the house, programmed to "kill the man in the room" but ultimately falls off a pier into the sea and short-circuits.

M-11 in other media
 M-11 appears in Lego Marvel Super Heroes 2 via the "Agents of Atlas" DLC pack.

Gideon Mace

Jason Macendale

Mach-VI

Machete

Ferdinand Lopez

Alfonso Lopez

Mariano Lopez

Machine Man

Machine Teen

Machinesmith

Al MacKenzie

Moira MacTaggart

Mad Dog

Mad Dog Rassitano

Mad Jim Jaspers 
Sir James "Mad Jim" Jaspers is a character in American comic books seen in Marvel Comics. He was created by Alan Moore, David Thorpe and Alan Davis for Marvel UK. He is a powerful supervillain who was the archenemy of Captain Britain and Excalibur as well as a few other heroes as well as the main antagonist of the Excalibur series.

In the reality of Earth-238, James Jaspers, a British politician waged a political war on mutants. He had been elected into office as a member of the English Parliament because of his anti mutant and anti super heroes stance and politics, however Jaspers was a mutant himself with powerful reality-warping abilities. His political façade and motivations for the elimination of his fellow mutants and superheroes was essentially to ensure his supremacy. Jaspers seemed a gifted politician and adapt at swaying popular public opinion, with lines such as "if they were honest they wouldn't wear masks" but whether he was always mad, or descended into madness with the advent of his mutant reality warping powers, Jaspers had lost his sanity. Jaspers of Earth-238 was so determined to rid his world of mutants, he began to move beyond drumming up anti-mutant sentiment and constructed an incredibly powerful adaptive cybernetic construct known simply as the Fury to hunt and eliminate all superpowered beings.

Jaspers had also formed an advanced technological equipped military task force charged with eliminating super powered beings, this group known as the Status Crew. Typically the Status Crew would round up powered beings to be held in concentration camps with their extermination there not long after. The Fury would deal with bigger threats. It would take less than two years for super powered beings to be on the verge of extinction. The Fury had been programmed by Jaspers to allow Jaspers to live as the sole powered being.

Unmatched in power by any other being, any potential threats ruthlessly destroyed by the Fury, Jaspers adopted the persona of Mad Jim Jaspers, a bank robber and crook paying homage to the Mad Hatter from Alice in Wonderland as well as continuing the Lewis Carroll book theme with his own bank robbing crew, the Crazy Gang. It was around this time that the Omniversal Guardian Merlyn aware of not just this reality's version of Jaspers danger to the multiverse, but the Jim Jaspers of the 616 reality who Merlyn realized possessed even greater reality warping power. Merlyn would teleport one of the few remaining super heroes of Earth-238, Captain UK Linda McQuillan, to the 616 designated reality. Importantly he would also do so whilst she was being observed by the deadly cybiote the Fury. The Earth of 238 would fall into disarray due to the mad machinations and reality warping of Jaspers. It had become known as a crooked earth. Of similar concern was that the Jaspers of 616 had begun his political ascension, a worrying sign of things to come.

Upon returning to mainstream reality/616, Captain Britain found that another Sir James Jaspers was leading an anti-superhero campaign, with the aid of Henry Peter Gyrich and Sebastian Shaw, members of the Hellfire Club.

Jaspers managed to win a landslide general election victory on his anti-superhero platform and became Prime Minister of Britain. Events began to mirror those of Earth-238 and Jaspers unleashed the force of the Jaspers Warp upon London, causing much chaos and devastation. However, Jaspers found himself under attack from the reality-hopping Fury, and the two engage in a large-scale reality-warping battle in which Jaspers was ultimately killed by the Fury, who teleported him outside the universe, where he would have no reality to control and thus be rendered powerless.

Mad Thinker

Madame Hydra

Ophelia Sarkissian

Unnamed

Valentina Allegra de Fontaine

Elisa Sinclair

Madame Masque

Madame Menace

Madame Sanctity 
Madame Sanctity (Tanya Trask) is a fictional character appearing in American comic books published by Marvel Comics. The character was created by Scott Lobdell, Jeph Loeb and Gene Ha. She first appeared in Askani'Son #1 (January 1996), though her true identity was revealed in Uncanny X-Men #-1 (July 1997). She's a member of the Askani and as such, her story ties into that of Rachel Summers and Cable. Madame Sanctity was originally Tanya Trask, daughter of Dr. Bolivar Trask, the creator of the Sentinels. Like her brother Larry, Tanya was a mutant, though she possessed time travelling powers, as well as telepathic and psychokinetic abilities. When these manifested, Tanya was lost in the timestream, until being pulled into the Askani future by Rachel Summers. Tanya became a member of Rachel's Askani Sisterhood and took on the alias Sanctity.

Madame Web

Madcap

Artie Maddicks 
Arthur "Artie" Maddicks is a fictional character appearing in American comic books published by Marvel Comics. He first appeared in X-Factor #2 (March 1986) and was created by Bob Layton and Jackson Guice. The mutant son of Dr Carl Maddicks, Artie's characterization was as a mute mutant. A version of him appears in the film, X2: X-Men United, portrayed by Bryce Hodgson as a student at Xavier's school.

Madman

Maelstrom

Maestro

Maggott

Magician

Lee Guardineer

Son of Guardineer

Elliott Boggs

Magik

Magique 

Magique, originally known as Magic, is a Shi'ar warrior and member of the Imperial Guard. The character, created by Chris Claremont and Dave Cockrum, first appeared in The Uncanny X-Men #107 (October 1977). Magique has the ability to create realistic illusions. Like many original members of the Imperial Guard, Magique is the analog of a character from DC Comics' Legion of Super-Heroes: in her case Princess Projectra.

Along with Gladiator, Mentor, and Quasar (later known as Neutron), Magic was one of the founding members of the Imperial Guard, brought together centuries earlier by T'korr, Majestor of the Shi'ar Empire, for the purpose of stopping Rook'shir, who has been driven insane by the malevolent force known as the Dark Phoenix, and was laying waste to the galaxy.

Magic and the Guard first clash with the X-Men and Starjammers, on behalf of D'Ken and Davan Shakari, over the fate of the Shi'ar Princess Lilandra Neramani. After the battle, Lilandra takes over as Majestrix, and the Guard swears allegiance to her.

After Lilandra's sister Deathbird stages a coup and becomes the new Shi'ar Empress, the Guard comes into conflict with a rogue Space Knight named Pulsar (not the Imperial Guard member Impulse, who later changes his name to Pulsar) and an alien named Tyreseus. After a large conflict which also involves Rom and other Space Knights — which leads to the deaths four Guardsman — Pulsar and Tyreseus are defeated.

Some time later, Empress Deathbird sends the Imperial Guard to Earth to battle the combined forces of the Starjammers and the superhero team Excalibur, so that she can claim the power of the Phoenix Force for herself. The Guard are forced to retreat when Deathbird realizes the Starjammers are led by Lilandra. (Some time later War Skrulls impersonating Charles Xavier and the Starjammers depose Deathbird and restore Lilandra to the throne. Deathbird cedes the empire back to Lilandra as she has grown bored of the bureaucracy.)

Now named Magique, the character takes part in "Operation: Galactic Storm," which details an intergalactic war between the Shi'ar and the Kree. Magique and the Imperial Guard steal the original Captain Marvel's Nega-Bands from the dead hero's tomb. Using Kree artifacts, including the Bands, the Sh'iar create a massive super weapon, the "Nega-Bomb." Ultimately, the Nega-Bomb device is successfully detonated, devastating the Kree Empire, with billions dying instantaneously (98% of the Kree population). The Shi'ar annex the remnants of the Kree Empire, with Deathbird becoming viceroy of the Kree territories.

At the beginning of the "War of Kings" event, Magique is part of the Imperial Guard faction that attacks Ronan the Accuser on his wedding day. The Guard also slaughters many new Nova Corps recruits. Magique leads a squad of Imperial Guards to Knowhere, base of the Guardians, tracking Adam Warlock. However, Adam has begun turning into his dark counterpart, the Magus, and tricks Magique's troops into killing her.

Some years later, she is replaced by a member of the Subguardians in Guardians of the Galaxy (vol. 5) #1.

Magma

Jonathan Darque

Amara Aquilla

Magneto

Magnir

Magnum

Magnus the Sorcerer 
Magnus the Sorcerer was the mentor of the first Spider-Woman, Jessica Drew. He first appeared in Spider-Woman #2 (May 1978), and was created by Marv Wolfman and Carmine Infantino. Magnus grew up in the 6th century AD, in the time of King Arthur. Turned down as an apprentice by Merlin, he became the student, and eventually lover, of Morgan le Fay. In the 20th century, the centuries-old sorcerer could possess the bodies of the living. Magnus' spirit took possession of Jonathan Drew and aided the High Evolutionary in organizing the Knights of Wundagore.

Maha Yogi 

Maha Yogi is a fictional character in the Marvel Universe. He first appeared in Journey into Mystery #96 (September 1963), and was created by Stan Lee and Jack Kirby.

Yogi was apparently born 10,000 years ago in what is now Central Europe. He apparently was a savage that came to possess some portion of the same Bloodgem that Ulysses Bloodstone would later possess, which gave him immortality and eternal youth. He later came to Britain during the time of Camelot, and impersonated the real Merlin while he was away. The Eternal Sersi exposed the impostor, and the real Merlin placed him in suspended animation.

The false Merlin was revived in modern times, still posing as Merlin, and battled and was defeated by Thor, after which he went back into the coffin. He later became a professional criminal and took the name Warlock, organizing a band of armored mercenaries. He abducted Marvel Girl, battled the original X-Men, and was rendered comatose by Professor X.

Later, as the mentalist Maha Yogi, he attempted to create an army of mind-slaves. He fought and was defeated by the Beast and Iceman. The Maha Yogi then became the chairman of Merlin Industries. With Mongu, the Maha Yogi plotted world conquest, but was defeated by the Hulk and Doctor Druid. During his encounter with the Hulk, his fragment of the Bloodgem was destroyed and he rapidly aged into helplessness. Some time later, the Maha Yogi was revealed to have been created by the Caretakers of Arcturus and to have turned against them. He later appeared alive with his youth apparently restored by unknown means.

As a result of mutation induced by the Caretakers of Arcturus, the Maha Yogi had the psionic abilities to control the minds of others, create illusions, project psionic force bolts, levitate objects as large as a building, teleport himself, create force fields and alter his own appearance. His psionic powers have a limited range.

Thanks to his possession of a fragment of the Bloodstone, the Maha Yogi is virtually immortal, and has a physically malleable body.

He has attempted to use true magic, performing a ritual to summon the demon known as Grendel's Mother.

Mahkizmo

Brett Mahoney

Mahr Vehl

Mainframe
Mainframe is the name of three fictional characters appearing in American comic books published by Marvel Comics.

Earth-691 version

The Earth-691 version of Mainframe is a future counterpart of Vision that is featured in the title Guardians of the Galaxy. Main Frame is the chief operating system of an entire planet, and the guardian of the shield of hero Captain America. He soon joins the Guardians of the Galaxy spinoff, the Galactic Guardians.

Earth-982 version

The Earth-982 version of Mainframe appears when Iron Man decided to retire from the hero business. Iron Man did not want to let his legacy end, designing an android patterned after the Iron Man armor, and called this robotic warrior Mainframe. Mainframe was brought online when Trolls attacked the young boy Kevin Masterson. Mainframe assembled all of the reserve Avengers and fought to save him. When the fight was over, Mainframe, Stinger, J2, and Kevin (as the new Thunderstrike) formed A-Next, a new team of Avengers.

Right away, Mainframe attempted to establish himself as team leader. He frequently encountered resistance from Stinger, who did not know that Mainframe was a robot. But when Mainframe was terminally damaged, exposing his secret, Stinger was one of the first to volunteer to shrink inside to repair him. They later learned that whenever Mainframe was severely injured, he would upload his personality and memories into a replacement body assembled on an orbiting satellite.

Mainframe soon became more than just a high-tech hero to his teammates, he became a friend. He even learned to share his duties as leader with his teammate American Dream.

Earth-616 version
The Earth-616 character known as Mainframe is an android who is a member of the Guardsman Alpha Squad. He is killed in battle against the zombie Squadron Supreme from the Marvel Zombies universe.

Mainframe in other media
 The Earth-982 iteration of Mainframe appears in Hulk and the Agents of S.M.A.S.H., voiced by Jeffrey Combs. This version is a gaming A.I. created by Iron Man that attained sentience. In the episode "Wheels of Fury", Mainframe threatens to destroy the city if Iron Man loses its real-life game, which the former merely saw as continuing to latter's challenge as ordered. The agents of S.M.A.S.H. join Iron Man in defeating Mainframe's robots in a roller derby before persuading Mainframe not to attack the city. Desiring to learn more about the real world, Mainframe creates a new body for itself and leaves to see the world. In the episode "Planet Monster" Pt. 2, Mainframe joins the agents of S.M.A.S.H. and the Avengers, among other heroes, to combat the Supreme Intelligence's forces.
 The Earth-691 iteration of Mainframe appeared in a mid-credits scene in the live-action Marvel Cinematic Universe film Guardians of the Galaxy Vol. 2, voiced by an uncredited Miley Cyrus. This version is a member of the Ravagers and a former member of Yondu Udonta's original team. Following his death, Mainframe meets with Stakar Ogord, Martinex T'Naga, Charlie-27, Aleta Ogord, and Krugarr and reform their team in Udonta's memory.

Major Liberty
Major Liberty (real name John Liberty) is a superhero empowered by the ghosts of America's past, and appeared in U.S.A. Comics #1-4.

Major Mapleleaf

Lou Sadler

Lou Sadler Jr.

Maker

Makkari

Malekith the Accursed

Malice

Killmonger lackey

Nakia

Unnamed

Susan Storm-Richards

Anthropomorpho

Marauder

Karl Malus

Mammomax

Man-Ape

Man-Beast

Man-Bull

Man-Eater 
Man-Eater is a fictional character appearing in American comic books published by Marvel Comics.

Malcolm Gregory is a man who was used in a Hydra experiment that fused him with a tiger giving him the appearance of a humanoid tiger. He was freed by Battlestar and joined up with Silver Sable's Wild Pack.

Man-Elephant

Man-Killer

Man Mountain Marko

Man-Spider 
There are different versions of Man-Spider that appear in American comic books published by Marvel Comics.

Peter Parker

Spider-People 
The Spider-Island storyline features various minor characters as the Man Spiders, otherwise known as Spider Creatures, within Marvel Comics. This depiction, created by Dan Slott and Stefano Caselli, first appeared in The Amazing Spider-Man #662 (May 2011) initially dubbed Spider-People and officially shown in The Amazing Spider-Man #666 (July 2011) with the Tarantula and the Spider-King. New York's various citizens end up with spider abilities due to the Jackal's "science experiment" for Adriana Soria / Spider-Queen involving bedbugs, using DNA from Peter Parker / Spider-Man to create the Spider virus. The Tarantula and the Spider King are the Jackal's enforcers. New York's citizens inflicted with the Spider virus. Gangsters (such as Mateo Caldron, Leonard Kornfeld, and Sal Morone) are manipulated to act as Spider-Man imposters but are defeated by New York's superhero community, and civilian Spider-People inspired by Peter. The Future Foundation work on a vaccine that can keep people from gaining spider powers but does not cure Spider-People while the incident's masterminds watches as all of New York's infected citizens mutate into the Man Spiders. As the Spider-Queen and the Jackal relish in the chaos, some of the Spider Creatures go to Anti-Venom to be cured. The Spider King tried to release the Spider virus outside of New York's quarantine, but is defeated by Agent Venom who also delivers Anti-Venom to be used as a cure for the Spider-Flu and the Spider King. Meanwhile, Horizon Labs' antibodies serum developed by Max Modell and Michael Morbius almost gets sabotaged by the Tarantula but is defeated by his genetic template and thrown in the serum pool which cures the clone's mutations. During all of this, various individual groups, such as Flag-Smasher and A.I.M., try to take advantage of the Man Spiders' confusional chaos but are repelled by various superheroes, such as Hawkeye, Hercules and Black Widow. The Man Spiders are repelled by an anti spider group which were manipulated by Spider-Girl and the Hobgoblin in holding off, while the creatures were siphoned for the Spider-Queen's giant spider form which fights Agent Venom and Steve Rogers as well as the Avengers and the X-Men while Spider-Man uses incendiary devices (from Doctor Octopus and the Spider-Slayers) carrying the cure and Kaine Parker slays the conspiracy's instigator, reversing the Man Spiders' mutations and finally curing New York's population.

Man-Spider in other media 
Peter Parker's Man-Spider form appeared in the "Neogenic Nightmare" episodes of Spider-Man with its vocal effects provided by Jim Cummings.

The Man-Spiders appear in Marvel's Spider-Man. The Man-Spiders first appear in the five-part episode "Spider-Island" where the Jackal's genetically engineered spider experiments' destruction releases chemicals that cause New York's citizens (such as Norman Osborn) to obtain spider-like abilities and eventually mutate into the Man-Spiders controlled by the Jackal. However, the Man-Spiders are eventually cured by the Spider Team. A small army of Man-Spiders appear in "Spider-Man Unmasked", under Swarm's control for a gladiatorial arena-based streaming show, the Underground Monster League. The Man-Spiders are eventually defeated by Spider-Man, Ghost-Spider, Spider-Girl and the Ultimate Spider-Man, and the individuals are cured.

Man-Thing

Manbot 
Manbot (Bernie Lechenay) was created by Steven T. Seagle and Scott Clark, and first appeared in Alpha Flight (vol. 2) #1 (1997). Manbot is a biomechanical construct working for Canada's Department H and is a member of the Canadian superhero team known as Alpha Flight. He is also acting as a spy for Department H so as to monitor Alpha Flight surreptitiously.

Victor Mancha

Mandarin

Mandrill

Dino Manelli

Mangler
Mangler is the name of two different characters appearing in American comic books published by Marvel Comics.

Shadrick Daniels
The first Mangler debuted in issues 34–35 of Power Man. Shadrick Daniels is the brother of the villain Spear and joins him in his attempt to get revenge on Noah Burnstein. Mangler is a professional wrestler with no super powers and is quickly defeated by Luke Cage.

Lucius O'Neil
The second Mangler debuted in The Thing #28. Lucius O'Neil is a professional wrestler who underwent the Power Broker's strength augmentation. When Thing and Sharon Ventura were planning to expose the Power Broker's operations, Mangler was among those sent to stop them.

Mangler in other media
The Shadrick Daniels version of Mangler appears in The Avengers: Earth's Mightiest Heroes. In the episode "To Steal An Ant-Man", he and Scythe fight Luke Cage and Iron Fist in an alley at the time when they were helping Hank Pym find the person who stole the Ant-Man costume.

Mangog

Manifold

Manikin

Manphibian

Manslaughter 
Manslaughter is a supervillain, an assassin by trade and a psychopath by nature. He appeared for the first time in Defenders #133 (July 1984). He is assigned by a drug czar to assassinate the Defenders. He invades their Rocky Mountain headquarters, and stalks and nearly kills them. He is turned over to the police in Elijah, Colorado. Manslaughter aids the Defenders and the Interloper in battle against Moondragon and the Dragon of the Moon. He joins his life force with Andromeda, the Valkyrie, and Interloper to drive the Dragon of the Moon from Earth, and his body turns to dust. With the others, they later take on host bodies of living persons, and assist Doctor Strange in battling and crushing the Dragon of the Moon. Manslaughter has minor psionic talents, telepathic powers enabling him to perceive the activity of the autonomic nervous systems of other people. He can use this to influence the peripheral vision and subliminal hearing of others, making him invisible and virtually inaudible from a person's peripheral senses.

Manta

Manta is a member of the Shi'ar Imperial Guard. Created by Chris Claremont and John Byrne, she first appeared in The Uncanny X-Men #137 (September 1980). Manta possesses the power of flight. Manta's eyes only perceive heat (as in infrared radiation), allowing her to see in the dark. She can generate blinding flashes of white or blue light. Her species experiences memory in a manner different from that of most other species.

She has fought the X-Men on multiple occasions. She first fought the X-Men in the Shi'ar Empire's attempt to police the Phoenix Force.

She was with the Guard when they come into conflict with a rogue Space Knight named Pulsar and an alien named Tyreseus. After a large battle which also involved Rom and other Space Knights — which led to the deaths of four new Guardsman — Pulsar and Tyreseus were defeated.

Later, when Deathbird became Empress, Astra commanded the entire Imperial Guard, including Manta, to fight the combined forces of the Starjammers and Excalibur on Earth so that she could claim the power of the Phoenix Force for herself. The Guard were forced to retreat when Deathbird was put in danger. Some time later War Skrulls impersonating Charles Xavier and the Starjammers depose Deathbird and restored Lilandra Neramani to the throne. Deathbird ceded the empire back to Lilandra as she had grown bored of the bureaucracy.

Manta was again part of the Imperial Guard missions "Operation: Galactic Storm" and "Starblast."

Later during New X-Men, she fought the X-Men under the manipulation of Cassandra Nova. In the latter, Manta sought out Jean Grey, confident she could defeat Phoenix while armed with psychic armor, but Grey easily bested her in hand-to-hand combat.

Manta was one of the survivors of the battle with Vulcan. She had many further adventures with the Imperial Guard, in such storylines as "Secret Invasion," "X-Men: Kingbreaker," "War of Kings," "Realm of Kings," the "Infinity" crossover, the "Trial of Jean Grey," "Time Runs Out," and the return of Thanos.

Manta in other media
Manta appeared in X-Men. In the episodes "The Dark Phoenix" and "Fate of the Phoenix", she and the Imperial Guard had to fight the X-Men to determine Jean Grey's fate after the Phoenix Force attacked some of the galaxies.

Mantis

Anna Maria Marconi

Marrow

Truman Marsh 
Truman Marsh, also known as Tru, is a minor character appearing in Marvel Comics. The character, created by Danny Fingeroth (writer) and Ron Lim (artist), first appeared in Avengers: Deathtrap, the Vault #1 (July 1991). He was a warden of the Vault with the Guardsmen and drones as security. Marsh had a condescending notion towards superheroes, despite having apparent respect for Captain America and Hank Pym. Marsh's illegal experiments resulted in a prison break which he personally tried to have contained despite the Avengers' and Freedom Force's combined efforts. While his self-destruct sequence is disabled by Iron Man, Marsh used a hand repulsor to defend himself only to be killed by Venom.

Truman Marsh in other media 
 A variation of Truman Marsh appears in Avengers Assemble, voiced by William Salyers. This version is a disguise that Ultron utilizes while posing as a government liaison. 
 Truman Marsh appears in the Guardians of the Galaxy series finale "Just One Victory", voiced by Henry Winkler. This version is Star-Lord's grandfather.

Simon Marshall 
Dr. Simon Marshall is a minor character appearing in Marvel Comics. The character first appeared in Peter Parker, The Spectacular Spider-Man #64 (December 1981), and was created by Bill Mantlo and Ed Hannigan.

Dr. Marshall was a pharmaceutical chemist who was working for the Maggia to develop a new designer drug called D-Lite to act as a cheap substitute for heroin. He would lure teenaged runaways and the homeless to his secret laboratory on Ellis Island. He would have his men offer food and shelter, only to turn into his test subjects. This is how Tandy Bowen and Tyrone Johnson came into contact with Dr. Marshall; the two runaways were injected with D-Lite which had up until now proven fatal to others, surviving the ordeal and were unintentionally empowered. Another of his subjects was an unnamed human-smuggler was injected D-Lite by Dr. Marshall who waited to see what happens. After two of the runaways break open the window and escape, the human-smuggler who Dr. Marshall experimented on made a run for it too; D-Lite had elicit side-effects which later resulted in the crime lord Mister Negative. Cloak and Dagger track down the people behind the experimention while Spider-Man interfered, trying to stop the former two from killing people. Cloak and Dagger gathered all the people responsible for their condition, including Dr. Marshall. Spider-Man tried to stop Cloak and Dagger from killing in cold blood, but failed as Cloak's darkness makes them, including Dr. Marshall, run out of a window and plummet to their deaths.

Martinex

Martyr

Marvel Boy 
Marvel Boy is the name of several fictional characters appearing in American comic books published by Marvel Comics, including predecessor companies Timely Comics and Atlas Comics.

Martin Burns 
Martin Burns is the 1940s Marvel Boy. After a mysterious shadow revealed to him that he possessed the power of Hercules, he became a superhero. The character made only two appearances: Daring Mystery Comics #6 (June 1940), by the writer-artist collaborators Joe Simon and Jack Kirby, and USA Comics #7 (February 1943), by writer-artist Bob Oksner. Each featured a wildly disparate version of his origin, with the first positing him as the reincarnation of the mythic Greek demigod, while the second had him accidentally scratched by Hercules' mummified remains in a museum and "infected' with his superhuman strength, although both versions shared the basics noted above. The Official Handbook of the Marvel Universe: Golden Age 2004 reconciles these different origins by stating that there were two Marvel Boys named Martin Burns active in the 1940s.

Robert Grayson

Wendell Vaughn

Vance Astrovik

Noh-Varr

Marvel Girl

Jean Grey

Rachel Grey

Marvelman

Masacre 

Masacre is a Spanish-language vigilante first appearing in Deadpool #003.1 (2016), a member of Mercs for Money, referred to as "The Deadpool of Mexico".

He appears as a playable character in the Marvel Contest of Champions video game.

Masked Marauder

Masked Raider

Masque

Massacre

Mass Master

Master Hate 
Master Hate is a cosmic entity associated with the concept of Hate.

Master Izo

Master Khan

Master Man

Master Menace

Mastermind Excello 
Mastermind Excello (Earl Everett) is an American comic book character appearing in American comic books published by Marvel Comics. His only appearances for several decades were in Mystic Comics #2 and 3, published in the 1940s by Marvel's forerunner, Timely Comics, during a period that is known as the Golden Age of Comic Books. He later appears in the 2000s limited series The Twelve.

Mastermind Excello is a precognitive with great mental powers and physically honed to perfection who uses his powers to help the US Naval Intelligence Department. He makes use of his assets sensing spies on the European battlefield, to catch them, and thwart a gang of railway saboteurs.

"Mastermind Excello" is also an alias for Amadeus Cho.

Master Mold

Master of the World

Master Order 
Master Order is a cosmic entity associated with the concept of Order.

Master Pandemonium

Mastermind

Jason Wyngarde

Computer 
Mastermind is a computer under Captain Britain's home, Braddock Manor. He first appeared in Captain Britain #12 (December 1976). This Mastermind was an alien artificial intelligence that had been built by Captain Britain's father, Doctor James Braddock, Senior. Mastermind lived in the Braddock family's estate. Mastermind is entrusted with the care of several 'Warpies', mutated children, some of whom had superpowers. He is assisted by several government agents who had resisted their own leaders due to concern for the children. However, agents of R.C.X., led by the corrupt Nigel Orpington Smythe, raided Braddock Manor and forcibly removed the children. The rebelling agents were also kidnapped. Mastermind is later reprogrammed by Kang the Conqueror, and subsequently destroyed.

Martinique Jason

Alicia Masters

Matador

Manuel Eloganto

Juan

Match

Mathemaniac

Taki Matsuya

Mauler

Aaron Soames

Turk Barrett

Brendan Doyle

Unnamed

Maverick

Robert Maverick

Ebony Maw

Max

Maxam 
Maxam was created by Jim Starlin and Tom Raney, and first appeared in Warlock and the Infinity Watch #12 (January 1993). Maxam first appeared in a vision of Gamora, then wielder of the Infinity Gem of time, wherein Maxam murdered Adam Warlock. He later appeared on the island of the Infinity Watch with no memory of his past. Eventually it was revealed that Maxam was from an alternate future earth where the majority of humanity had been wiped out by the Universal Church of Truth, an organization ruled by the future evil self of Adam Warlock known as the Magus. Maxam was sent back in time to destroy Adam before he could become the Magus. Maxam can summon additional body mass increasing his strength and durability to levels he has stated as being an even match for Drax the Destroyer and Hercules, even allowing him to, through supreme effort, break free of the Invisible Woman's force-field when she had imprisoned him.

Luna Maximoff

Maximus the Mad

Melinda May

Mayhem

Kenny McFarlane

Tiny McKeever

Megan McLaren 

Megan McLaren is a fictional reporter in Marvel Comics. The character, created by Kurt Busiek and Mark Bagley, first appeared in Thunderbolts #1 (April 1997).

Megan worked for WJBP-TV and was considered one of the best TV journalists. She mostly reported the Thunderbolts' activities such as their battle with The Elements of Doom, Graviton and when Mach I surrendered himself to the authorities.

McLaren reported on Roxxon's press conference when they revealed that the Scorpion was now an employee of theirs. She later reported on the aftermath of a battle between the Hulk and the Avengers.

She reported on the Avengers return from the dead and got to interview She-Hulk, Black Knight, Quicksilver and Crystal before revealing who the new roster was going to be. McLaren reported on a parade that was held for the heroes and their battle with Ultron.

Megan McLaren in other media 
 Megan McLaren appears in Avengers Assemble, voiced by Vanessa Marshall. This version is a reporter for Daily Bugle Communications and often covers the Avengers' heroic activities.
 Megan McLaren appeared in the Marvel Cinematic Universe series Luke Cage, played by Dawn-Lyen Gardner. She is one of the many reporters who asks Mariah Dillard about her plans to change Harlem.

Meanstreak

Medusa

Harold Meachum

Joy Meachum 
Joy Meachum is a fictional character who first appeared in Marvel Premiere #18 and was created by Doug Moench and Larry Hama. The character is depicted in the comics as the daughter of Harold Meachum and the niece of Ward Meachum.

She blames Iron Fist for her father's death and attempts to kill him on several occasions, even going so far as to hire Steel Serpent to aid her in getting revenge.

A crime boss known as Boss Morgan takes Joy hostage because Rand Meachum Inc. was ruining his business. Iron Fist rescued her, but in a last-ditch effort for revenge she asked Morgan to kill him. When Morgan refused, she attempted to do so herself, but found she could not and ended her feud with him. Since then Joy has helped Iron Fist and his allies on their numerous adventures.

Joy Meachum in other media 

In the Iron Fist TV show set in the Marvel Cinematic Universe, Jessica Stroup played Joy as an adult and Aimee Laurence portrayed her as a child. Joy is still Harold's daughter, but Ward is her brother. Stroup said that Joy "absolutely loves" Rand, and his return to New York is "like this rebirth of what she once was, and she gets to ask these questions about herself because he's posing them to her." However, Stroup said that Joy would initially be unsure whether Rand is who he says he is.

Like Ward, Joy is initially doubtful of Danny Rand turning up alive, but eventually realizes the truth, even discreetly helping Danny by slipping his lawyer Jeri Hogarth a piece of evidence for using at an arbitration meeting. She is also shown to show concern towards Ward when he suddenly gets hooked on Madame Gao's heroin. Later on in the episode "The Mistress of All Agonies," Joy accidentally stumbles upon Harold in his penthouse. She assists her father into freezing the Rand Enterprises' bank accounts that are being used by the Hand. Joy is present with Harold when Ward shows up trying to get Joy away from Harold, after Bakuto gets him out of the hospital. Before Ward can leave with Joy, Bakuto and his men show up, having decided not to honor the deal he's struck with Ward so that he can stop Harold from freezing anymore Rand Enterprises accounts. Bakuto shoots Joy non-fatally to bring Danny out of hiding, and she is taken to the hospital. While she is recuperating, Ward shows her evidence that Harold has framed Danny for the Hand's drug smuggling. Upon leaving the hospital, Joy confronts Harold about this as he uses a cover-up. Joy later leaves Rand Enterprises as Danny, Colleen, and Ward engage and defeat Harold and his men. Following Harold's death and cremation as well as Danny becoming a business partner to Ward, Joy is visited by Davos at a restaurant in France who states that Danny must die, as their conversation is overheard by Madame Gao.

Ward Meachum

Megatak 
Megatak (Gregory Nettles) first appeared in Thor #328 (February 1983), and was created by Doug Moench and Alan Kupperberg. He was an industrial spy. He was inside an experimental video display when he gained his powers. He was defeated by Thor and Sif, and Thor drained his electrical abilities. When Megatak later reappeared in New York, he was gunned down by the Scourge of the Underworld disguised as a homeless man. Megatak was later among the eighteen criminals, all murdered by the Scourge, to be resurrected by Hood using the power of Dormammu as part of a squad assembled to eliminate the Punisher. Megatak's powers have completely taken him over, and he has morphed into a living computer program. Microchip is able to track the Punisher's hacker friend Henry, and Megatak travels into the hacker's computer and assaults him. Megatak then uses the connection to transport Blue Streak to Henry's location. He has since been recruited into the Crime Master's "Savage Six" to combat Venom.

Meggan

Seamus Mellencamp

Melter

Bruno Horgan

Christopher Colchiss

Unnamed

Menace 
Menace (Lily Hollister) is a fictional character, a villainess appearing in American comic books published by Marvel Comics. The character is most commonly depicted as an enemy of Spider-Man. Her first appearance as Lily Hollister is in The Amazing Spider-Man #545, and her first appearance as Menace is in The Amazing Spider-Man #550, which is the start of the second story arc in the "Brand New Day" overarching storyline that followed the events of "One More Day".

Daughter of District Attorney William "Bill" Hollister, Socialite Lily Hollister was dating Harry Osborn. Lily found a hidden door in Harry Osborn's closet and found an old journal of his. She uncovered the location of one of Norman Osborn's secret rooms in the journal. When she had first gone in, she found all of the Goblin's equipment along with some experiments. After accidentally knocking over some experimental Goblin chemicals, she absorbed them into her skin, and was now able to transform into her "Menace" form at will. Stealing a weapons cache of the original Green Goblin, Norman Osborn, Menace was later hunted down by Jackpot. During her search, she met Spider-Man and reluctantly accepted his help. Menace attacked a council meeting and kidnapped councilwoman Lisa Parfrey, with Spider-Man and Jackpot working together to try and stop her. Menace's glider slammed into the rescued councilwoman, killing her, and Menace escaped the crime scene, but not before accusing Spider-Man of being responsible for the woman's death.

Menace later tried to threaten Bill Hollister, her father and one of the candidates for the election, into dropping out of the race for mayor while she continued supporting him in her public identity. She was sabotaging his campaign for his own good against Randall Crowne, his opponent, and began destroying her fathers advertisements. She also broke into their home and tried to threaten him into backing out of the running.
Menace then proceeded to threaten the supposedly 'redeemed' Norman Osborn who had come to town when her actions inadvertently revealed that Crowne had been operating an illegal sweatshop in the city and Crowne asked him for help. Menace recreated Osborn's original death by ramming him with her glider, however, Osborn survived the attack and Menace spared him, after accusing Osborn of being a fool for devoting all his time and assets to Spider-Man's destruction.
During the Skrull Invasion, Lily and Harry Osborn were attacked on the street, after getting away from Harry and changing into Menace she killed one of the invading Skrulls, and then set her sights on Jackpot, believing her to be "Spider-Man's girlfriend". Their fight took her into the path of one of the Skrull's, with Menace's glider exploding on contact. Menace survived, though badly injured, and limped away from the scene.

When Menace attacked a Hollister Rally, she managed to badly beat Spider-Man (who had earlier been shot through the arm) and claimed a "citizen's arrest" to the arriving police. Menace then flew into the Hollister party headquarters, and changed back into Lily Hollister, just before Harry walked in on her. She revealed to Harry that she was Menace. She then told Harry that she accepted his earlier marriage proposal. On Election Day, Menace attacked two police officers for arresting her former friend Carlie Cooper for a crime she didn't commit, then attacked Spider-Man when he appeared. Menace was about to finish him until Harry, as the Green Goblin, appeared and shot Menace with a serum, with Spider-Man giving her the full injection. This caused Menace to change back into Lily and was seen in a live broadcast, with her father watching in shock and in tears of this revelation. A few days after the event, with Bill Hollister as the new Mayor of New York, Lily was now in prison and was visited by Norman Osborn, who discovered the engagement ring given to her by Harry and welcomed her to the family.

Menace in other media

A male version of Menace appears as a boss (and one of the inter dimensional variables of Green Goblin) in Spider-Man Unlimited .

Donald Menken 

Donald L. Menken is a character in Marvel Comics. The character, created by Roger Stern and John Romita Jr., first appeared in The Amazing Spider-Man #239 (April 1983).

As the personal assistant of Norman Osborn, Menken immediately became loyal and unflinching. His first task was to make sure that one of Oscorp's research scientists remove any recent traces of work. Not only did he assist Norman, he also answered to Harry Osborn and Liz Allan. Menken was eventually promoted to Director of Personnel. Menken soon teamed up with Roderick Kingsley to plot a takeover bid of Oscorp. Though the takeover bid failed, his involvement led Spider-Man to consider him as a potential candidate to the Hobgoblin's identity. Menken at some point had joined the Cabal of Scrier and freed Norman from the psychiatric hospital. Norman later would greatly injure Menken; even though Menken survived from his injuries, he was never seen again.

Donald Menken in other media 
 Donald Menken makes a minor appearance in The Spectacular Spider-Man episode "Final Curtain", voiced by Greg Weisman. Spider-Man determines him as the primary suspect in his investigations into the Green Goblin's identity, only for the Goblin to attack Menken and Spider-Man, disproving the web-slinger's theory.
 Donald Menken appears in the 2014 live-action film The Amazing Spider-Man 2, portrayed by Colm Feore. This version was the personal assistant to the ailing Norman Osborn and mostly opposed Harry Osborn's ascension as Oscorp's president. He covers up Max Dillon's accident by blaming Harry with manufactured evidence, but is later forced to inject him with Richard Parker's cross-species spider venom to cure Harry's hereditary illness which transforms the latter into Green Goblin while Menken flees in the chaos. In a deleted scene, Harry as the Green Goblin drops Menken from Oscorp Tower to the latter's death.
 Donald Menken appears in the 2014 The Amazing Spider-Man 2 film tie-in video game, primarily voiced by Glenn Steinbaum and Christopher Daniel Barnes in the IOS version. This version is Harry Osborn's assistant. The Chameleon poses as Menken throughout most of the game to oversee Oscorp and the Kingpin's illegal experiments at Ravencroft, particularly "Project Venom", which involves a symbiote meant to cure Harry of the Osborn family's life-threatening genetic condition. After the symbiote is tested on Cletus Kasady, he transforms into Carnage and escapes, infecting many inmates with the symbiote. When Spider-Man comes to investigate the chaos, he rescues "Menken" from the inmates, who informs him of the symbiote's weaknesses before being taken to safety. He later visits the Kingpin, who has taken over Oscorp after Harry's death, and unmasks himself as the Chameleon. The real Menken's whereabouts remain unknown. In the IOS version, Menken is a representative for Oscorp in selling weapons to criminal gangs. He is captured by Spider-Man during a meeting with Kraven the Hunter and Hammerhead, and killed by the Green Goblin before he can be interrogated.

Mentallo

Mentor

A'lars 

Mentor (A'lars) is the leader of the Titanian colony, where he is the father of Thanos and Starfox. The character first appeared in Iron Man #55, and was created by Jim Starlin. His back-story was based on Greek mythology. Some years later, he was retconned to be a member of the Eternals, separately based on Greek mythology.

Imperial Guard 

Mentor is a member of the Shi'ar Imperial Guard. Created by Chris Claremont and Dave Cockrum, the character first appeared in X-Men #107 (October 1977). Mentor is capable of instantaneous processing of vast amounts of information. Like many original members of the Imperial Guard, Mentor is the analog of a character from DC Comics' Legion of Super-Heroes: in his case Brainiac 5.

Mentor was one of the first initiates of the Imperial Guard, assembled by the Shi'ar along with Gladiator, Magic, Mentor, and Quasar for the purpose of stopping Rook'shir. Defeating Rook'shir, The Guard becomes the first line of defense of the Shi'ar Empire.

Some centuries later, Mentor is present when the Shi'ar Empire comes into conflict with the X-Men regarding the Phoenix entity, with the Guard battling them at the command of Emperor D'Ken and his sister, the Grand Admiral, Princess Lilandra Neramani.

After the 2009 "War of Kings" storyline, Mentor succeeds Gladiator as praetor of the Imperial Guard. A short time later, he and his lover, fellow Imperial Guardsman Plutonia, choose to bond with Raptor amulets; he is taken over by Strel and vanishes.

Mephisto

Mercurio the 4-D Man

Mercury

Mercy 

Mercy (Abigail Mercy Wright) is a fictional supervillain appearing in American comic books published by Marvel Comics. Mercy first appeared in The Incredible Hulk (vol. 2) #338, and was created by Peter David and Todd McFarlane.

Abigail Mercy Wright is an extremely unpredictable and dangerous foe, and has given multiple explanations to her origin, including being an alien, an angel, or, much later, a woman who gained her powers through radiation treatments to save her from brain cancer. She considers herself on a mission of "mercy" to "help" those who are overcome with despair, but don't have the strength to commit suicide, believing that she is doing them a favor. This can include anything from dropping an electric toaster into the bath, to guiding the spirit of a comatose person to the afterlife. The Hulk is one of the few people Mercy has been unable to "help," as he refuses to stop fighting, no matter how horrible his existence may be.

As part of the Marvel NOW! event, Mercy later appears as one of the Red Hulk's recruits for his new black ops incarnation of the Thunderbolts.

Mercy in other media 
 Mercy appears in The Incredible Hulk: Ultimate Destruction, voiced by Vanessa Marshall. This version appears as the bodyguard of Director Emil Blonsky to get rid of gamma-irradiated beings. Mercy has the powers of teleportation, telekinesis, energy manipulation, and levitation. She got her powers from gamma radiation, which was used as treatment that cured her of a brain tumor that would have eventually killed her. During her boss fight, Mercy plans to stop the Hulk from getting the fuel rods, but failed. As Mercy tries to tell the Hulk about her ex-employer's current plans, Blonsky kills Mercy as he blows up the building she was in to try to stop the Hulk.

Merlin

Merlyn

Irene Merryweather

Mesmero

Metal Master

Metalhead

Meteorite

Mettle

Lynn Michaels

Microbe 

	
Microbe (Zachary Smith Jr.) is a fictional superhero appearing in Marvel Comics. The character, created by Skottie Young and Zeb Wells, first appeared in New Warriors (vol. 3) #1. He is a mutant with the ability to communicate with germs and other microscopic organisms. He was a member of the New Warriors.
 	
Smith has a rather tragic past. His biological father, a prominent medical researcher, thought he had discovered a way to cure previously incurable diseases. Instead, it turned out that Microbe had unknowingly used his mutant power and "talked" the diseases into acting out the results his father wanted. Disgraced, his father disowned Microbe, leaving the teen heartbroken and alone. Out of compassion, Night Thrasher adopted him and began training him to be a superhero, making him a member of the New Warriors.
	
While tracking some escaped supervillains with the New Warriors, Microbe, alongside his foster father Night Thrasher, is killed in Stamford, Connecticut as part of the New Warriors reality show. This event sparks the need for the Superhuman Registration Act and the ensuing Civil War, as well as making the surviving and former New Warriors members the most hated people in the US.

Microbe in other media
Matthew Moy was set to portray Microbe in the live-action New Warriors TV series before it was cancelled.

Microchip

Micromax

Midas

Mordecai Midas

Malcolm J. Meriwell

Midgard Serpent

Midnight 
Midnight (Jeff Wilde) was a partner of Moon Knight's. While training his new sidekick, Moon Knight was targeted by the Secret Empire. In an attempt to eliminate Moon Knight for past confrontations with the criminal organization, the Secret Empire seemingly disintegrated Midnight with an energy blast.

Midnight is resurrected, and possesses a cyborg body enhanced with rocket-powered feet, super-extensible arms, super-strength, and laser beams along with a cyborg nurse, Lynn Church. He is believed to be killed a second time in a battle with Moon Knight, Spider-Man, Darkhawk, The Punisher, Nova and Night Thrasher.

He is seen a third time with Lynn Church after a murderous spree to get the attention of Moon Knight again. Moon Knight confronts the two in Mogart's underground lair. Moon Knight grudgingly kills Midnight to let his soul rest.

Proxima Midnight

Midnight Sun

Midnight Fire

Miek

Milan

Jake Miller 
Jake Miller is a minor character appearing in American comic books published by Marvel Comics. The character, created by Jim Starlin and George Perez, first appeared in Infinity Gauntlet #1 (July 1991). He is a thief and killer who celebrates alongside his friends (Bambi Long and Ralph Bunker) by driving drunk, killing all three.

Alternative versions of Jake Miller 
The Ultimate Marvel version of Jake Miller is seen with a mecha-sized vibranium suit of armor using pirated Quark-based technology. He volunteered to prevent a power plant's nuclear catastrophe but his family gets killed by Hydra. Confronting the Ultimates, Miller defeats Hawkeye and intended to blow up his own armor in despair but holds his own against Captain America, Iron Man and Thor before being convinced to surrender.

Millie the Model

Mimic

Mimir 
Mimir first appeared in The Mighty Thor #240 (October 1975), and was created by Roy Thomas, Bill Mantlo and Sal Buscema. Mimir was a child of Buri and uncle of Odin. He was a former opponent of Odin whom Odin transformed into a fiery being. He now dwells in the Well of Wisdom in Asgard. Odin sacrificed his right eye to Mimir for the wisdom to forestall Ragnarok. Mimir is a virtually omniscient being with precognitive abilities. Thor travels to Hildstalf, to seek out the wisdom of the Well of Mimir. Mimir was apparently slain in the destruction of Asgard at the hands of Thor.

Mind-Wave

Erik Gelden

Unnamed

Mindblast

Mindless Ones

Mindworm 

Mindworm first appeared in The Amazing Spider-Man #138 by Gerry Conway and Ross Andru. William Turner was a superhuman mutant with limited telepathic powers. He had an oversized cranium and was extremely intelligent who started off using his powers to crime due to the tragedy of his parents' death using his powers against Spider-Man.

Eventually, Mindworm attempted to reform but his problems were too difficult for him to control and he allowed himself to be killed by common street thugs to end his great suffering in The Spectacular Spider-Man (vol. 2) #22 (February 2005).

Nico Minoru

Robert and Tina Minoru

Minotaur

Mythological

Myklos Vryolak

Dario Agger

Miracle Man

Mirage

Desmond Charne

Unnamed

Miss America

Madeline Joyce

America Chavez

Miss Arrow

Miss Patriot
Miss Patriot (Mary Morgan) is a Timely Comics Golden Age superhero who is the Patriot's sidekick after being taken captive by Dr. Groitzig and Signore Scharrolla who use her as a test subject for super-soldier serum.

She first appeared as the Patriot's companion in Human Torch Comics #4-5 (Spring/Summer 1941) as Mary Morgan. Mary and the Patriot then appeared in Marvel Mystery Comics #21 (July 1941). Mary appeared sporadically, and took on the Miss Patriot mantle in Marvel Mystery Comics #50 (December 1943). She continued to appear on and off until Marvel Mystery Comics #73 (June 1946).

Missing Link

Time Traveling

Lincoln

Ray Morgan

Circus of Crime

Mister E 
Mister E (Victor J. Goldstein, also known as Victor Jay) is a fictional character appearing in American comic books published by Marvel Comics. The character was a Timely Comics Golden Age superhero, a wealthy businessman by day turned masked vigilante by night. He appeared in Daring Mystery Comics #2 (February 1940), and reappears in 2008 in The Twelve.
His only story has been reprinted in The Twelve #1/2.

Mister Fantastic

Mister Fear

Zoltan Drago

Starr Saxon

Larry Cranston

Alan Fagan

Mister Fish

Mister Gideon

Mister Hyde

Mister Immortal

Mister Jip

Mister Justice

Mr. Justice (Timothy Carney) is a superhero, and a member of the superhero team called the First Line. He was created by Roger Stern and John Byrne, and first appeared in Marvel: The Lost Generation #12. He was the younger brother of Yankee Clipper. Mr. Justice was, in his teenage years, recruited into the First Line. He was at this time known as Kid Justice. He was highly influenced by his brother during their partnership, and once when faced with a difficulty, he asked himself "what would Clipper do?" He had several times been saved by Nightingale and Yankee Clipper.  He has also been cited by teammates as the living legacy of Yankee Clipper after Clipper's disappearing in Marvel: The Lost Generation #4. Mr. Justice seemingly died in Marvel: The Lost Generation #12, along with most of the First Line group members while battling a Skrull fleetship.

Mister M

Mister Negative

Mister Rasputin

Mister Sensitive

Mister Sinister

Mister X

Mistress Love 
Mistress Love is a cosmic entity associated with the concept of Love.

Yorkie Mitchell

MJ

Mockingbird

MODAM

Max Modell

MODOK

George Tarleton

MODOK Superior

Modred the Mystic

Modular Man

Mogul of the Mystic Mountain 
Mogul of the Mystic Mountain first appeared in Thor #137 (February 1967), and was created by Stan Lee and Jack Kirby. He is the evil ruler of Zanadu the Mystic Mountain in Skornheim, a land in the Asgardian dimension. Mogul commands a powerful "Jinni Devil" and other mystical beings. Mogul long ago conquered the land that was home to Hogun the Grim. Thousands perished in his coup and under his tyranny, as Mogul laid waste to the land. Hogun escaped with his fathers and brothers, who dedicated their lives to finding the Mystic Mountain, Mogul's home; Hogun's relatives perished seeking the Mountain. His powers include teleportation, matter rearrangement and illusion casting.

Mojo

Mole Man

Molecule Man

Molten Man

Mondo 
Mondo is the name of two characters which have appeared in the series Generation X. The first Mondo was a superhero later revealed to be a clone of the supervillain Mondo, who appeared years later. The first Mondo's first appearance was in Generation X #3.

Fictional character biography
Not much is known of the Samoan mutant called Mondo. He was once friends with Cordelia Frost, Emma Frost's younger sister. In an attempt to make a bid for the position of White Queen of the Hellfire Club, Cordelia had Mondo contained and handed him over to the Inner Circle of the Hellfire Club. Cordelia's scheme backfired; the Hellfire Club kept Mondo but denied Cordelia membership. Cordelia went to Emma, headmistress of the Massachusetts Academy, for help and, soon after, Mondo was rescued by Generation X and subsequently accepted an invitation to join the school.

Generation X later learned that the Mondo they had rescued wasn't the real Mondo but a clone, a plant-based simulacrum created by Black Tom Cassidy who had infiltrated the Hellfire Club and rescued Mondo. After taking Mondo under his wing, Black Tom created a clone of the young mutant to infiltrate the Massachusetts Academy so that Black Tom could exact vengeance on his cousin, Banshee, who was the headmaster of the academy.

As Banshee and Emma Frost battled Black Tom, the Mondo clone began hunting down the members of Generation X. As the Mondo clone was about to attack Jubilee, he was shot dead by the anti-mutant militant Bastion, chief operative of Operation: Zero Tolerance.

Later, the real Mondo appeared alongside Black Tom and Juggernaut. Completely loyal to Black Tom, the real Mondo battled the members of Generation X. Generation X attempted to talk to Mondo into not fighting, but Mondo laughed at them, reminding them that he has never met them before. Generation X and their teachers were able to defeat their opponents, but the trio still managed to escape.

Mondo was confirmed to be alive and powered as he appeared with the rest of Generation X during Cyclops' Million Mutant March in Washington D.C.
Mondo has recently appeared in X-Men Blue issue #8 alongside several other mutants in an effort to hunt down the young X-Men Blue team. This team's leader is Emma Frost, as she is part of the mutant sovereign state New Tian during Marvel's Secret Empire story arc.

Powers and abilities
Mondo is capable of taking on the properties of any organic or inorganic material with which he comes into contact. When using his power, Mondo is able to grow in mass with an assumed proportionate growth in strength to superhuman levels.
Mondo can absorb matter into his body, gaining the mass, appearance, and other properties of the matter in question. This change will remain until Mondo's body "digests" the organic matter, which is then disintegrated.

Mondo is also able to use his power to travel through organic matter, such as dirt, and can appear instantaneously in the immediate vicinity of where he entered the earth.

Other versions
In the Age of Apocalypse, Mondo was one of the members of Generation Next taught by Colossus and his wife Shadowcat. Unlike his Earth 616 counterpart, Mondo was truly heroic and had no reservations whatsoever about helping the innocent. They were given the mission by Magneto to infiltrate the Core -- a prison facility watched over by the Sugar Man—and rescue Colossus' sister Illyana, who was crucial to Bishop's plan to save all of reality. Mondo was given the task of sneaking in through the ground and finding Illyana. He let the little girl stay in his stomach while he was in this dirt form, but he had to be wary not to keep her in too long or else she would be digested. Despite his best efforts, Sugar Man found the pair and was able to kill Mondo with his razor-sharp tongue, even though Mondo was still in his dirt form. He constantly referred to himself in the third person.

Mondo in other media
In the Generation X TV movie, Mondo was played by Bumper Robinson.

Mongoose

Monkey Joe 
Monkey Joe is a fictional squirrel appearing in American comic books published by Marvel Comics. The character, created by Steve Ditko and Will Murray, first appeared in Marvel Super-Heroes (vol. 2) #8
(November 1991)

Fictional character biography
Monkey Joe was the first squirrel with whom Doreen Green communicated when she was ten years old. They became friends after Doreen saved Monkey Joe from being chased by a dog, and the little squirrel subsequently encouraged Doreen to use her powers to help people. When she grew up, Doreen became Squirrel Girl.

Monkey Joe helped her to defeat Doctor Doom during her first outing as a superhero when she was fourteen years old. The duo later joined the Great Lakes Avengers, with Squirrel Girl making certain that Monkey Joe was an official member. Monkey Joe met his demise at the hands of Leather Boy, an ex-GLA member kicked out for not actually having any powers, who attacked the team disguised as Doctor Doom.

After his death, Squirrel Girl found a new squirrel companion named Tippy Toe and gave her a pink bow. Tippy Toe mimics Monkey Joe's role as Squirrel Girl's sidekick. To honor him, Doreen would sometimes wear a pendant with the initials MJ on it around her neck. Monkey Joe was seen playing cards with the rest of the fallen GLA members when Doorman briefly visited the after-life. He seemed very bitter about his demise and less forgiving than the other deceased members.

Powers and Abilities
Seemingly those of an ordinary squirrel with above average intelligence. Monkey Joe seemed to possess an understanding of computers.

His weakness is direct pressure to his entire body.

Monkey Joe in other media
 Monkey Joe appears alongside Tippy-Toe as Squirrel Girl's sidekick in Ultimate Spider-Man.

Alison Mongrain 
Alison Mongrain is a recurring character in The Amazing Spider-Man comic books during the latter half of the Clone Saga. She served as an agent of Norman Osborn, who had returned to North America to personally finish off Peter Parker and destroy everything he had held dear, which included his unborn child May Parker. In the final storyline of the Clone Saga, "Revelations", Mongrain's task was to poison Peter's pregnant wife Mary Jane Watson, forcing her into premature labor. In the alternate universe of the MC2 Spider-Girl title, Mongrain was tracked down by Peter's first clone Kaine, who rescued May from her grip and returned her to Peter and Mary Jane. Having bonded with May whilst keeping her prisoner, Alison returns sometime later with the intent of killing Normie Osborn whose brief tenure as the Green Goblin convince her that he would harm the child that she grew attached to. Spider-Girl. having been informed of her intents by Kaine reassured Mongrain that the child is safe by unmasking herself.

Monsteroso

Amazing Adventures

Tales to Astonish

Montana

Moon-Boy

Moondark 
Moondark operated as a stage magician in San Francisco, and when Spider-Man came to town he feared that Spider-Man would interfere with his plans. While Jack Russell observed his performance at a small bijou, Moondark mesmerized the whole audience including Jack (also known as the Werewolf). Moondark sent the Werewolf to ambush Spider-Man at the San Francisco Bay, where he was vacationing. As the two heroes fought, Spider-Man discovered and tackled Moondark, who was killed as he fell into the water.

The Dark Beings whom Moondark worshipped claimed his soul but allowed him to return to Earth to claim other souls and buy back his own. He acted as a stage performer at a carnival in New York and created a Soul-Orb to claim the souls of the other carnival performers one by one. The Ghost Rider, Johnny Blaze, while working at the carnival also lost his soul to Moondark, which Moondark kept in a ring he wore. Spider-Man, as Peter Parker, went to the carnival and recognized the Ghost Rider who was now a part of Moondark's show. Parker returned as Spider-Man, but was captured by the Ghost Rider and the others under Moondark's control. When Moondark tried to steal Spider-Man's soul, he was able to destroy Moondark's ring and free the Ghost Rider, who destroyed the Soul-Orb with a burst of hellfire. Moondark's demonic master arrived to take the only soul available—Moondark's.

Moondark was able to return to the living world, seeking to reclaim Blaze's valuable soul to bargain for his own. Lairing outside Las Vegas, he sent mutated vultures to attack Blaze and attract his attention. He tricked Ghost Rider into resuming human form, subdued him and bound him with magical bonds that prevented him from transforming. Hamilton Slade, then known as the Phantom Rider, was nearby and drawn to the magical conflict. When Moondark attacked Slade, his concentration weakened which allowed Blaze to break free and transform into Ghost Rider again. Ghost Rider destroyed the new Soul-Orb and Moondark fled to his other-dimensional realm.

Moondark joined forces with the Water Wizard to get revenge on Blaze. Moondark enhanced the Water Wizard's power which allowed him to overpower Ghost Rider, and Moondark appeared and mocked the seemingly helpless Ghost Rider. Ghost Rider set Moondark's body on fire, and he fled back to his dimension.

Moondragon

Moon Girl

Moonglow

Melissa Hanover

Arcanna Jones

Moonhunter 
Moonhunter is a fictional character in the Marvel Universe. He was created by Mark Gruenwald and Rik Levins, and first appeared in Captain America #402 (July 1992). Zach Moonhunter once worked as a werewolf wrangler under Dredmund the Druid's mental control. He first encountered Captain America outside Starkesboro, Massachusetts. He fought Captain America, and captured him. Zach Moonhunter is an athletic man with no superhuman powers, though he is an excellent hand-to-hand combatant and a highly accomplished pilot. As a werewolf hunter, Moonhunter wore a mask and body armor that were both silver-plated for protection against werewolves. The mask was surmounted by a "wig" composed of sharp, jagged strands of silver. He carried guns that fired silver bullets, which can kill werewolves. He wore gauntlets that fired silver darts which could harm werewolves or drug-tipped darts that could induce unconsciousness in human beings. He used a whip with a silver tip that could cause werewolves pain. He used a rope coated with silver as a lasso for capturing werewolves. His body armor was equipped with artificial claws he could use for help in scaling walls. As the Druid's operative, he piloted a two-man jet-powered sky-cycle. Afterwards, he reformed, and forsaking his werewolf-fighting costume, became Captain America's personal pilot for the remainder Gruenwald's run on Cap's title (issue 444).

Moon Knight

Danielle Moonstar

Moonstone

Lloyd Bloch

Karla Sofen

Gloria Morales 
Gloria Morales is a fictional character appearing in American comic books published by Marvel Comics.

Gloria Morales is the mother of Rio Morales and the grandmother of Gloria Morales.

Gloria Morales in other media 
Gloria Morales appears in the Spidey and His Amazing Friends episode "Halted Holidays", voiced by Sophia Ramos.

Miles Morales

Rio Morales 

Rio Morales is a fictional character and the mother of Miles Morales / Spider-Man. Created by writer Brian Michael Bendis and artist Sara Pichelli, she first appeared in Ultimate Comics Spider-Man (vol. 2) #1 (November 2011), which is set in the alternate reality of the Ultimate Marvel imprint.

Rio is a Puerto Rican woman who is married to the African-American Jefferson Davis. She works as a Hospital Operations Administrator at Brooklyn General Hospital. While Jefferson distrusts superheroes, Rio holds a positive view of them in general and of the new Spider-Man in particular. When Conrad Marcus attacks Jefferson, Spider-Man confronts and defeats Venom and Rio learns that Miles is Spider-Man, but is fatally wounded by police gunfire. She expresses pride in Miles before dying, and tells her son not to tell Jefferson about this. Rio's death made Miles take a one-year sabbatical as Spider-Man. After the events of the 2015 "Secret Wars" storyline, Molecule Man repays Miles' help by transferring the Morales family to the mainstream Marvel Universe, resurrecting Rio in the process. Jefferson is aware of Miles's double life, but Rio is initially not. She later learns the truth and struggles with it before eventually supporting her son's vigilante activities. She later gives birth to a daughter named Billie Morales.

Rio Morales in other media 
 Rio Morales appears in Ultimate Spider-Man, voiced by Maria Canals-Barrera. This version is a widow with a healthy mother-son relationship with Miles Morales, and she is aware and supportive of her son as Spider-Man. In the episode "Miles From Home", she is about to celebrate her birthday alongside Miles, but her son is called away to help Peter Parker / Spider-Man save the multiverse from the Green Goblin. In the process, the Siege Perilous is destroyed and leaves Miles stranded in Peter's universe, much to Rio's dismay. In "Return to the Spider-Verse" Pt. 4, Rio is kidnapped by Wolf Spider, but is subsequently saved by the 'prime' Spider-Man, Kid Arachnid and Spider-Woman. Rio later leaves with her son to the 'prime' universe.
 Rio Morales appears in Spider-Man: Into the Spider-Verse, voiced by Luna Lauren Vélez.
 Rio Morales appears in Insomniac Games's Spider-Man series, voiced by Jacqueline Pinol. This version is a middle school science teacher. 
 In the 2018 Spider-Man video game, she plays a minor role, becoming a widow after Jefferson died from Mr. Negative's attack on City Hall but helps Miles cope by getting her son get a job at F.E.A.S.T with the help of Peter and May Parker as an alternative to more therapy for her son.
 In the 2020 follow-up Spider-Man: Miles Morales, Rio campaigns for a position in the City Council in the midst of a violent conflict between Roxxon and the Underground. She later discovers her son's activities as Spider-Man of which she supports and helps evacuate Harlem. The ending reveals she won the City Council position.
 Rio Morales appears Spidey and His Amazing Friends, voiced by Gabrielle Ruiz.

Morbius, the Living Vampire

Mordred

David Moreau 
The character's name is an homage to the title character of H.G. Wells' science-fiction novel The Island of Doctor Moreau.
While working for the island nation of Genosha, he developed a mind control device which made mutant slavery possible. Moreau created the mutate-process: all inhabitants of Genosha were tested at their 13th birthday for any presence of the X-factor gene. If they tested positive, they were turned into mutates: their memories were erased and their personality changed to become completely obedient, they were sealed in special suits and their powers were genetically changed to serve the needs of their country. At this time, Moreau became known as the Genegineer (a portmanteau of "Genetic Engineer").

Christian Davenport remarked that the atrocities committed by David Moreau are repeatedly related to the Holocaust and American slavery in the Genosha series of comics.

Morg

Jim Morita

Maris Morlak

Morlun

Morning Star

Morph

Morpheus

Morrat

Eli Morrow 

Elias W. "Eli" Morrow is a fictional spirit in the Marvel Universe. The character, created by Felipe Smith and Tradd Moore, first appeared in All-New Ghost Rider #1 (May 2014).

Eli Morrow was a Satan-worshiping serial killer who worked for the Russian mafia. He was considered the black sheep of his family and shoved Robbie Reyes' mother down a flight of stairs while she was pregnant, resulting in Robbie's younger brother Gabe being born paraplegic. He was killed by the mob, but his spirit possessed a 1969 Dodge Charger, which Robbie later inherited. After Robbie is gunned down by men hired by Calvin Zabo, Morrow attaches himself to Robbie's soul, becoming the new Ghost Rider.

Eli slowly begins to corrupt Robbie in an attempt to turn him into a killer, even going so far as to possess Gabe to fulfill his revenge against the mob boss that killed him. Robbie eventually accepts his uncle's influence and his dual identity as Ghost Rider under the condition that they only go after the worst people in the world.

Eli Morrow in other media
Eli Morrow appears in season four of the live-action Marvel Cinematic Universe television series Agents of S.H.I.E.L.D., portrayed by José Zúñiga. This version is an engineer who worked for Momentum Labs as part of a project to develop a machine that can generate materials out of nothing. The head scientists, Joseph and Lucy Bauer, used an ancient book called the Darkhold to make their dream a reality. However, Morrow discovered this and tried to claim the Darkhold for himself, but failed to when the experiment went awry, turning Lucy and her team into ghosts while Eli was sent to jail for beating Joseph into a coma after the latter refused to relinquish the book. Morrow makes his first appearance in the episode "Let Me Stand Next to Your Fire" when his nephew Robbie Reyes and S.H.I.E.L.D. Agent Phil Coulson visit him in jail to learn what happened the day of the experiment. In "Lockup", Lucy kidnaps Morrow as she needs a living being to use the Darkhold to renew the experiment. In "The Good Samaritan", when S.H.I.E.L.D. comes to rescue him, Eli reveals his true intentions regarding the Darkhold and activates Momentum Labs' machine, gaining the ability to create matter by pulling energy from other dimensions. In "The Laws of Inferno Dynamics", Eli uses his powers to create a demon core to enhance himself, but S.H.I.E.L.D. and Robbie stop him, with the latter dragging Eli into another dimension before the demon core can destroy half of Los Angeles.

Mortis

Moses Magnum 
Moses Magnum is a fictional supervillain first appeared in Giant-Size Spider-Man #4 (April 1975), and was created by Gerry Conway and Ross Andru. He is an arms dealer and terrorist.

Magnum was born in Ethiopia, but sided with Benito Mussolini's occupying army against his own people. Magnum later became a naturalized American citizen. He became president of the Deterrence Research Corporation (DRC), the world's foremost independent weapons manufacturing firm. As an arms expert, Magnum battled Spider-Man and the Punisher. Magnum surprisingly survived after the Punisher exposed him to chemical weapons. Then, he seemingly fell to his death after a battle with Luke Cage. However, Magnum was rescued by Apocalypse and granted superhuman powers which Magnum dubbed his "Magnum Force". His powers included superhuman strength and geologically based powers to cause earthquakes and sense disruptions in the Earth.

Magnum next threatened to create earthquakes to sink Japan unless he was named the nation's ruler. His plan was foiled by an assault by the X-Men and Sunfire on Magnum's Kuril Islands headquarters. Banshee disrupted Magnum's earthquake beam, but suffered a long-term loss of his own sonic powers in the process.

Re-establishing his company as Magnum Munitions, Magnum purchased the classified Deathlok cyborg technology from Cybertek. After the criminal High-Tech stole the technology, Magnum sent one of his agents in a massive Terrordome weapons platform to retrieve it, but was thwarted by Deathlok. Magnum subsequently bid against rival weapons manufacturers A.I.M. for a defense contract, destroying their world headquarters after they refused to withdraw their bid. Magnum used the subsequent profits to outfit a new army, conquering the African nation Canaan and seeking to restructure it into a homeland for African-Americans. Magnum then sought to ensure Canaan's economic independence by invading neighboring Wakanda, but Wakanda's king, the Black Panther, foiled the invasion with Deathlok's aid.

Later, Magnum's efforts to regain control of his power and destroy a floating resort using a stolen experimental seismic cannon were foiled by the combined efforts of the Avengers and future Avenger Triathlon. His own powers opened a fissure beneath him, seemingly sending him falling to his doom. Magnum somehow survived the fall, though how has not been revealed. At that time. He was present at the Pan-African Congress on the Treatment of Superhumans.

He next encountered Spider-Man. During the Dark Reign storyline, Moses escaped from prison through a plot by Norman Osborn to give Daken good publicity and was almost killed by a massive explosion intended by Osborn to clean up the resulting mess.

Magnum next appeared in Iron Man/Thor attempting to sell a special satellite he invented.

Moses Magnum's body generates seismic force which amplifies his natural strength, gives him an unknown degree of durability and attunes him to seismic vibrations. He can unleash this energy to cause vibratory shockwaves, minor tremors or devastating earthquakes. These waves will emanate from his body in all directions unless he purposefully tries to channel them in a single direction, usually along the length of his arms and through the tips of his fingers.

Moses Magnum in other media
Moses Magnum appears in the Iron Man: Armored Adventures episode "Panther's Prey". This version is responsible for T'Chaka's death as part of a coup with a group of mercenaries and does not demonstrate any superpowers. After stealing a piece of Vibranium from Wakanda and traveling to the U.S., he plans to give it to A.I.M. so they can use it in their MODOC project. However, he is stopped by Black Panther and Iron Man and taken back to Wakanda to face justice.

Mother Night

Motormouth

Mountjoy

Moving Shadow 
Moving Shadow is a fictional supervillain and the half-brother of Shang-Chi. Created by Doug Moench and Paul Gulacy, he first appeared in the MAX comics imprint Shang-Chi: Master of Kung Fu (November 2002).

Moving Shadow was born to the criminal mastermind Zheng Zu and raised in secrecy while highly trained in martial arts and assassination. After Shang-Chi's defection from his criminal organization, Zheng Zu groomed Moving Shadow to replace him. Under Zheng Zu's tutelage, Moving Shadow embraced his father's teachings and served him loyally without question. To ensure the success of his Hellfire weapon, Zheng Zu dispatched Moving Shadow to kill Shang-Chi and his allies Black Jack Tarr, Clive Reston and Leiko Wu. Eager to prove himself superior to his half-brother, Moving Shadow repeatedly clashed with Shang-Chi, who was previously unaware of his existence. Shang-Chi eventually emerged victorious after a vicious fight with Moving Shadow but refused to kill him. With his plains thwarted once again by Shang-Chi, an enraged Zheng Zu executed Moving Shadow for his failure.

Powers and abilities
Much like his half-brother, Moving Shadow is a highly skilled martial artist and assassin. He is shown to be proficient in many forms of weaponry, including the jian.

Alyssa Moy

Ms. Marvel

Carol Danvers

Sharon Ventura

Karla Sofen

Kamala Khan

Ms. Thing 

Ms. Thing (Darla Deering) is a famous celebrity in Marvel Comics. The character, created by Matt Fraction and Mike Allred, first appeared in Marvel NOW! Point One #1 (December 2012).

She was a pop star who dated Johnny Storm. When Reed Richards announced that he and the Fantastic Four were going to travel through space and time, Richards told the other members to find suitable replacements in the case that they do not return after four minutes. She along with Ant-Man (Scott Lang), She-Hulk and Medusa were chosen. She was given an artificial Thing suit and dubbed herself Ms. Thing. During her time with the Fantastic Four she began to date Scott Lang, but the relationship dissolved when Scott's daughter, Cassie, was revived. She later attacked Scott in her Ms. Thing armor only for the two to team up to battle Magician. Afterwards, it is revealed that Darla hired him through the Hench App for her new TV show. She teams up with Scott again to rescue Cassie from Darren Cross; their relationship still uneasy. When Scott is in prison, Darla visits him and it appears that the two wish to resume a relationship.

Powers and abilities 
Darla possess an artificial suit that resembles the body, and imitates the strength of, Ben Grimm. The suit is also self-contained into a pair of rings that immediately form the suit when Darla puts them together and chants "Thing ring, do your thing!".

Multiple Man

Jack Murdock

Maggie Murdock

Matt Murdock

Mike Murdock

Murmur

Allan Rennie

Arlette Truffaut

Mutant Master 
Mutant Master was a member of the supervillain team, Factor Three. He was also a member of the Siris race and once on Earth he posed as mutant human. He secretly sought to trigger a war between the US and what was then known as the USSR to wipe out the human race. However, his followers turned against him when he was exposed as being an alien, and to avoid capture he committed suicide.
The Mutant Master was created by Roy Thomas and Ross Andru. The character was first mentioned in X-Men #26 (November 1966).

Junzo Muto

Mysterio(n)

Quentin Beck

Daniel Berkhart

Francis Klum

Mysterion

Mystique

References 

Marvel Comics characters: M, List of